Cycling teams with the name Faema, sponsored by Faema,  include:

 Faema (cycling team, 1955–1962), known as Faema from 1955 to 1962
 Flandria (cycling team), known as Flandria–Faema in 1963 
 Faemino–Faema, known as Faema in 1968 and 1969